The Funeral Mountains are a short, arid mountain range in the United States along the California-Nevada border approximately 100 mi (160 km) west of Las Vegas. The mountains are considered a subrange of the Amargosa Range that form the eastern wall of Death Valley.

The crest of the range is within Death Valley National Park. The range is separated from the Grapevine Mountains to the northwest by the narrow Boundary Canyon and is separated from the Black Mountains by Furnace Creek Wash on the southwest and from the Greenwater Range at the narrow Travertine Point on the south. The broad flats of the Amargosa Desert lie across the border to the northeast in Nevada. The highest point in the range is Pyramid Peak, at 6703 ft (2043 m).

The first movement of Ferde Grofé's Death Valley Suite is a symphonic musical portrayal of pioneer settlers trudging through the dry craggy peaks of the Funeral Mountains.

References

External links

BLM: Funeral Mountain Wilderness

Death Valley
Amargosa Desert
Mountain ranges of Inyo County, California
Mountain ranges of the Mojave Desert